Viktor Andriyovich Slauta (born 2 January 1952) is a Ukrainian politician who was Minister of Agrarian Policy and Food in 2004 and 2010.

References 

Living people
1952 births
Agriculture ministers of Ukraine
21st-century Ukrainian politicians
Vice Prime Ministers of Ukraine
Fifth convocation members of the Verkhovna Rada
Sixth convocation members of the Verkhovna Rada